Dexter electron transfer (also called Dexter electron exchange and Dexter energy transfer) is a fluorescence quenching mechanism in which an excited electron is transferred from one molecule (a donor) to a second molecule (an acceptor) via a non radiative path. This process requires a wavefunction overlap between the donor and acceptor, which means it can only occur at short distances; typically within 10 Å. The excited state may be exchanged in a single step, or in two separate charge exchange steps.

History
This short range energy transfer process was first theoretically proposed by D. L. Dexter in 1953.

Rate expression
The Dexter energy transfer rate, is indicated by the proportionality

See also 
 Fluorescence
 Quenching
 Förster resonance energy transfer
Surface energy transfer

References

Atomic physics
Fluorescence

Energy transfer